Kəmərli (also, Kemerli, Kyamarli, and Kyamerli) is a village and municipality in the Qazakh Rayon of Azerbaijan.  It has a population of 2,862.

Notable natives 

 Rafig Alijanov — National Hero of Azerbaijan.

References 

http://qazax.biz/?p=824

Populated places in Qazax District